Belous is a Russian-language surname literally meaning "a person with a white moustache". The Ukrainian-language surname Bilous has a similar etymology. Their Polish-language equivalent is Białowąs, or, less commonly, Białous.

Notable people with this surname include:
Ilya Belous (born 1995), Russian football player
Serghei Belous (born 1971), Moldovan footballer 
Sergei Belous (born 1970), Russian football player
Vasile Belous (1988–2021), Moldovan boxer

See also
 
Belousov (patronymic surname)

Russian-language surnames